Sombrero River–Navarro River Protected Zone, is a protected area in Costa Rica, managed under the Central Conservation Area, it was created in 1984 by executive decree 15436-MAG.

References 

Nature reserves in Costa Rica
Protected areas established in 1984